S Vremena Na Vreme (trans. From Time To Time) is a Serbian and Yugoslav rock band formed in Belgrade in 1972. S Vremena Na Vreme were one of the pioneers of the Yugoslav 1970s acoustic rock scene, and one of the pioneers in incorporating Balkan folk music elements into rock music on the Yugoslav rock scene.

S Vremena Na Vreme was formed by brothers Miomir "Miki" Đukić and Vojislav "Koki" Đukić, Asim Sarvan and Ljubomir "Ljuba" Ninković, all four singing and playing acoustic guitars. In the early 1970s the band gained popularity with their acoustic rock sound, and their debut album, S Vremena Na Vreme (1975), was widely praised by the critics. Their second album, Paviljon G, marked the band's shift towards electric sound. Soon after the album release, the band ended their activity. They reunited in 1993, releasing a studio, a live and a video album, before disbanding again in 1997. In 2013, the band reunited for the second time to mark 40 years since their debut release.

History

Early career, nationwide success and breakup (1972–1979)
Before the formation of the band, brothers Miomir "Miki" Đukić and Vojislav "Koki" Đukić performed in a high school band Pupoljci (The Buds) with flutist Bane Zarin. The band performed the covers of foreign rock hits. At the time, Miomir Đukić wrote the ballad "Sunčana strana ulice" ("Sunny Side of the Street"), which achieved some local popularity. During Pupoljci's activity, Vojislav Đukić went to music school, where he took classical guitar lessons, composed music on the lyrics of poet Miljenko Žuborski and music for theatre plays.

At the same time, Asim Sarvan came to Belgrade from Mladenovac for his studies of world literature. There he met Ljubomir "Ljuba" Ninković. Ninković came to Belgrade from Smederevo, previously performed in the bands Maskirani Anđeli (The Masked Angels), Pet Sounds and The Spooks (in latter he played the organ), and at the time he met Sarvan he performed as a singer-songwriter. He already had some success as an author, as his song "Slika" ("Picture") was recorded by Korni Grupa and released as a single in 1970. This song would, with altered lyrics, later be recorded by S Vremena Na Vreme under the title "Kao vreme ispred nas" ("Like the Time that's Coming").)

Đukić brothers, Sarvan and Ninković started working together recording humorous songs in Radio Belgrade studios for the then-popular radio show Tip top kabare. Soon they decided to form a band. After the suggestion of Boban Petrović, who worked as a recording technician in Radio Belgrade studios, they chose the name S Vremena Na Vreme (From Time to Time), as up to that point they gathered occasionally only.

In the beginning, the band mostly wrote music for theatre plays, including music for Lucrezia Borgia and The Mandrake performed in National Theatre in Belgrade, Beleške jedne Ane (Notes of an Anna) performed in the Đuro Salaj Theatre, and Nesumnjivo lice (An Unsuspicious Person) performed in Atelje 212. The band also recorded music for radio; the Radio Belgrade archive contains more than 100 recordings made by the band. During these recordings, the band introduced Balkan folk music elements into rock music (being one of the first Yugoslav bands to do so), used traditional instruments and experimented with various musical genres. Working mostly in studio, during the first period of their career the band rarely performed live. However, they appeared on the 1972 and 1973 concerts organized by Pop Mašina members in Belgrade's Košutnjak park, and on the 1974 BOOM Festival, the live version of their song "Odisej" ("Odysseus") appearing on the double live album BOOM Pop Festival Ljubljana '74. They also appeared on several pop music festivals. In both 1973 and 1974 they received the Best Original Music Award at the Festival of Yugoslav Radio held in Ohrid.

During the initial period of their career, the band cooperated with various musicians: Đukić brothers' former bandmate Bane Zarin, drummer Nikola Jager, drummer Ratislav Đelmaš (of YU Grupa), keyboardist Sloba Marković, bass guitarist Dejan Petković, flutist Dragoslav "Džib" Vokić, contrabassist Nebojša Ignjatović. During Sarvan's and Miomir Đukić's temporary absence from the band due to their army obligations, Tanja Bošković, Gorica Popović and Ljiljana Dragutinović, all of them drama students at the time, performed with the band as female singers. During this period, the band members took part in the recording of the albums by Jadranka Stojaković, Vlada i Bajka, Srđan Marjanović and Tamara and Nenad Pavlović. They also recorded music for the songs composed by Kornelije Kovač, which were performed by pop music singers.

S Vremena Na Vreme released their first single, featuring the songs "Sunčana strana ulice" and "Ponekad" ("Sometimes"), in 1973. The track "Ponekad" featured the monologue spoken by the actor Marko Nikolić. The single was released by Radio Kruševac and got the atentnion of the audience and the media, so the band was offered a contract by the one of two biggest record labels in Yugoslavia, Zagreb-based Jugoton. For Jugoton the band released the single with the songs "Čudno drvo" ("Strange Tree") and "Odisej". After the success of the single, the band signed their new contract with the second of two biggest record labels, Belgrade-based PGP-RTB. At the time, the band started appearing in Television Belgrade show Tip top kabare, based on Radio Belgrade show of the same title, for which the members of the band had already recorded. TV appearance brought them nationwide popularity.

In 1975, the band released their debut self-titled album. Most of the album lyrics were written in hotel Turist in Ljubljana on the last night of the album recording. The album featured Jager on drums (after the album recording Jager would become an unofficial member of the band) and Pop Mašina member Robert Nemeček on bass guitar. S Vremena Na Vreme brought hits "Tema Classica", originally composed by Ninković as a teenager, "Traži mene" ("Looking for Me"), "Utočište" ("Sanctuary") and "Biblijska tema" ("Biblical Theme"), the latter featuring verses from The Book of Psalms. The album, especially the lyrics and the arrangements, partially inspired by works of The Beatles, was praised by the press.

The band's following album, Moj svet (My World), released in 1978, was a compilation consisting of the songs from the band's 7-inch singles. During 1978 and 1979, in Belgrade Youth Center, the band held performances under the title Bistro kod plave sove (Blue Owl Bistro), which followed the play Rastibuđilizovane klejbezable performed by amateur theatre Teatar levo. In March 1979, S Vremena Na Vreme held a successful tour across Poland, on which they performed together with several amateur theatres from Belgrade. During the same year, the band, with the symphonic rock band Tako, organized the first quadraphonic sound concert in Yugoslavia, in Belgrade Youth Center.

In 1979, the band released their second studio album Paviljon G (Pavilion G), which marked the band's shift towards electric sound. The album featured the song "Rok kritičar" ("Rock Critic") which dealt with the expansion of punk rock in Yugoslavia. After the album was released, Vojislav Đukić went to serve the army. and the band members decided to disband, partially due to new musical trends on the Yugoslav scene and the great popularity of new wave bands.

Post-breakup (1980–1992)
After the band ended their activity, Sarvan formed the band Muzej Sarvan (Museum Sarvan), wrote songs for folk music singers, and, in 1984, released a solo album entitled Asime, spasi me (Asim, Save Me), which he recorded with Baklava Band and keyboardist Laza Ristovski. Most of the songs on the album were written and produced by Ninković. Ljuba Ninković started working in Radio Belgrade as a host, and with Vlada Janković "Džet" (a former Crni Biseri member) he formed the band Tunel, with which he recorded five albums. In 1985, Ninković took part in YU Rock Misija, a Yugoslav contribution to Live Aid. Vojislav Đukić wrote music for theatre plays, most notably Kapetan Džon Piplfoks (Captain John Peoplefox) performed in Radović theatre.

In 1983, S Vremena Na Vreme made a brief reunion to appear in Srđan Karanović's film Something in Between. In the film, the band members portrayed a kafana band which performs a combination of country and Serbian folk music.

In 1990, Ninković and Sarvan rerecorded some of the band's most popular songs and released them as Ljuba & Asim on the album Najveći hitovi grupe S Vremena Na Vreme (The Greatest Hits by the band S Vremena Na Vreme). At the beginning of the 1990s, Ninković, together with actor Milorad Mandić, worked on Radio Television of Belgrade children's show S one strane duge (Over the Rainbow). The two of them, together with a number of musicians, recorded the children's music album S one strane duge.

Reunion and second breakup (1993–1997)
On Sarvan's idea, in May 1993 in Belgrade Youth Center, the most notable musicians of Serbian 1960s and 1970s acoustic rock scene gathered to perform on a fund-raising concert. The good reception of the performance convinced S Vremena Na Vreme members to reunite. They held their comeback concert in Sava Centar on 5 November 1993, featuring keyboardist Saša Lokner (of Bajaga i Instruktori), bass guitarist Bata Božanić, drummer Ratko Ljubičić and percussionist Nenad Januzović performing with the band. The concert also features guest appearance by singer Snežana Jandrlić, who performed the song "Prvi sneg" ("First Snow"), originally recorded by her former band Suncokret. The recording of the concert was released on the video album S Vremena Na Vreme uživo, Sava Centar novembar 1993 (S Vremena Na Vreme Live, Sava Centar November 1993). At the same time the band released the compilation album Vreme ispred nas (The Time that's Coming) which featured a live version of "Sunčana strana ulice", and "Na početku i na kraju" ("In the beginning and in the End"), the latter originally recorded in 1973. In 1994, the song "Sunčana strana ulice" was released on Komuna compilation album Sve smo mogli mi: Akustičarska muzika (We Could Have Done All: Acoustic Music), which featured songs by Yugoslav acoustic rock acts.

In 1995, S Vremena Na Vreme released the studio album Posle kraja (After the End). The album featured Bata Božanić (on bass guitar), Saša Lokner (on keyboards), Čeda Macura (on drums), Pera "Joe" Miladinović (harmonica), and Marija Mihajlović (vocals on the song "Spavaj"). Ninković and Marija Mihajlović during the same year recorded the album Zvuk tišine (The Sound of Silence), which featured their versions of songs by Pink Floyd, Simon & Garfunkel, The Rolling Stones, The Beatles and other artists. The recording of the concert S Vremena Na Vreme held at Studio M in Novi Sad on 30 January 1996, which was a part of the NS Plus Unplugged series, was released on the live album Unplugged in the summer of 1997. The album featured a cover of Bob Dylan's song "Knockin' on Heaven's Door". After the album was released, the band disbanded once again.

Post breakup (1997–2013)
Ninković took part in the 1996–1997 protests against the regime of Slobodan Milošević. During 1999, Ninković and the Đukić brothers, with the actor Goran Sultanović, performed a cabaret show entitled Ja pevam svoj bluz (I'm Singing My Blues). The performances were based on the poetry of Vladislav Petković Dis, Milan Rakić, Matija Bećković, Bora Đorđević, Đorđe Balašević and others. In early 2000s Ninković joined the ethnic music group Bistrik Orchestra, led by singer Bilja Krstić. He produced the group's 2000 album Bistrik In 2002, he wrote music for the documentary film Beloglavi sup – čovekov prijatelj (Griffon Vulture – Man's Friend).

In 2003, Sarvan released the ethnic music album U potrazi za dobrim odgovorom (Searching for a Good Answer). The album featured songs recorded during the 1990s for Radio Television of Serbia show Radionica zvuka (Workshop of Sound).

In 2011, Ninković and the Đukić brothers reunited under the name Svremenaši (From-timers). The band performed on the 2011 Belgrade Beer Fest, and on 12 November, together with Croatian progressive rock band Drugi Način, held a concert in Belgrade Youth Center.

Second reunion (2013–2020)
In 2013, S Vremena Na Vreme reunited for a concert in Ilija M. Kolarac Endowment, to celebrate 40 years since the release of their debut single, "Sunčana strana ulice". The concert was held on 16 May, and featured guest appearances by Drago Mlinarec, Dušan Mihajlović "Spira" and Dragan Popović. After the concert, the band continued to perform live, their concert acitivity ending with the outbreak of COVID-19 pandemic in Serbia.

In 2020, Vojislav Đukić published the book of the band's lyrics.

Legacy
In 1989, the song "Traži mene" was covered by Yugoslav singer-songwriter and former Azra leader Branimir "Johnny" Štulić on his album Balkanska rapsodija (Balkan Rhapsody). In 2011, Štulić released a cover of "Sunčana strana ulice" on his official YouTube channel. In 2012, the song "Čudno drvo" ("Strange Tree") was remixed in by the Serbian project Laura 2000.

The album S Vremena Na Vreme was polled in 1998 as 30th on the list of 100 greatest Yugoslav popular music albums in the book YU 100: najbolji albumi jugoslovenske rok i pop muzike (YU 100: The Best albums of Yugoslav pop and rock music).

In 2011, the song "Moj svet" was polled, by the listeners of Radio 202, one of 60 greatest songs released by PGP-RTB/PGP-RTS during the sixty years of the label's existence.

The lyrics of 9 songs by the band were featured in Petar Janjatović's book Pesme bratstva, detinjstva & potomstva: Antologija ex YU rok poezije 1967 - 2007 (Songs of Brotherhood, Childhood & Offspring: Anthology of Ex YU Rock Poetry 1967 – 2007).

Discography

Studio albums
S Vremena Na Vreme (1975)
Paviljon G (1979)
Posle kraja (1995)

Live albums
Unplugged (1997)

Compilation albums
Moj svet (1978)
Vreme ispred nas (1993)

Singles
"Sunčana strana ulice" / "Ponekad" (1973)
"Čudno drvo" / "Odisej" (1973)
"Povratna karta" / "Đački rastanak" (1974)
"Jana" / "Tavna noć" (1974)
"Kao vreme ispred nas" / "Kad budem stariji" (1974)
"Dixie band" / "Tema za šargiju" (1975)
"Put putuje karavan" / "Priča sa istočne strane" (1977)
"Moj svet" / "Saveti dobroj kuci" (1977)
"Učinila je pravu stvar" / "Spavaj" (1978)

Video albums
S Vremena Na Vreme uživo, Sava Centar novembar 1993 (1993)

References

External links
 S Vremena Na Vreme at Discogs
 S Vremena Na Vreme at Prog Archives

Serbian rock music groups
Serbian progressive rock groups
Serbian folk rock groups
Yugoslav rock music groups
Yugoslav progressive rock groups
Musical groups from Belgrade
Musical groups established in 1972
Sibling musical groups